The Cristur gas field is a natural gas field located in Cristuru Secuiesc, Harghita County. It was discovered in 1920 and developed by and Romgaz. It began production in 1930 and produces natural gas and condensates. The total proven reserves of the Cristur gas field are around 852 billion cubic feet (24 km³), and production is slated to be around 52.5 million cubic feet/day (1.5×105m³) in 2010.

References

Natural gas fields in Romania